Mike Featherstone is a British sociologist. He is director of the Theory, Culture & Society Centre and the Professor of Sociology at Goldsmiths, University of London, UK, and is visiting professor in Barcelona, Geneva, Kyoto, Recife, São Paulo, Tokyo and Vancouver. He has been influential in generating international funding and organizing conferences such as the Ubiquitous Media Conference (2005) in Tokyo. He is a founding editor of the journal Theory, Culture & Society (1982–) and the Theory, Culture & Society book series (1991–). He is also the editor-in-chief of the journal, Body & Society (1995–).

Works
Featherstone's main research interests are social theory and cultural theory, consumer culture and global culture, ageing and the body. His books and articles have been translated into sixteen languages.

Author
Consumer Culture and Postmodernism (1991, second edition 2007)
Undoing Culture: Globalization, Postmodernism and Identity (1995)

Co-author
Surviving Middle Age (1982)

Editor
Postmodernism (1988)
Global Culture (1990)
Georg Simmel (1991)
Cultural Theory and Cultural Change (1992)
Love and Eroticism (1999)
Body Modification (2000)

Co-editor
The Body: Social Process and Cultural Theory (1991)
Global Modernities (1995)
Cyberspace/Cyberbodies/Cyberpunk: Cultures of Technological Embodiment (1995)
Images of Ageing (1995)
Simmel on Culture (1997)
Spaces of Culture (1999)
Recognition and Difference (2002)
Automobilities (2005)
Problematizing Global Knowledge (2006)

References

External links
 Mike Featherstone's page on the SAGE website

Year of birth missing (living people)
Living people
British sociologists
Writers about globalization
Academic journal editors
Academics of Goldsmiths, University of London